Gerald Alexander (born June 28, 1984) is an American football coach and former safety,. He played college football at Boise State, and was selected by the Detroit Lions in the second round of the 2007 NFL Draft. He also played for the Jacksonville Jaguars, Carolina Panthers, Miami Dolphins, and New York Jets.

Alexander was a former graduate assistant with Arkansas State University and University of Washington.  In July 2015, he became the defensive backs coach at Indiana State University. In December 2015, he accepted the position of defensive backs coach at Montana State University, working under head coach Jeff Choate.

Early years
Alexander attended Rancho Cucamonga High School from 1998 to 2002, where he was a track and field athlete as well.

He was one of the players who helped lead Boise State to their improbable Fiesta Bowl win over Oklahoma in the 2006 season. While at Boise State, Alexander was a four-time First-team All-WAC selection.

Professional career

Detroit Lions
Alexander played all 16 games of his rookie season when safety Daniel Bullocks suffered a season-ending knee injury during a preseason game against the Indianapolis Colts. During that 2007 season Gerald recorded 81 tackles, 59 solo and 22 assisted. He also had 2 sacks, interceptions and fumble recoveries.

Jacksonville Jaguars
On June 26, 2009, he was traded to the Jacksonville Jaguars for Dennis Northcutt. On October 19, 2010, the Jaguars released Alexander.

Carolina Panthers
On November 23, the Panthers signed Alexander. He became a free agent after the season.

Miami Dolphins
Alexander signed with the Miami Dolphins on August 28, 2011. Alexander was released on September 2, 2011, by the Miami Dolphins. Re-signed on October 19, 2011.

New York Jets
Alexander was signed by the New York Jets on December 13, 2011, to add depth to the safety position following a season-ending injury to starting safety Jim Leonhard. He was released on March 14, 2012.

Coaching career

Arkansas State
Alexander served as an undergraduate assistant on the coaching staff of Arkansas State for the 2013 season.

Washington Huskies
Alexander joined the Washington Huskies coaching staff as a graduate assistant in 2014 under head coach Chris Petersen.

Indiana State
After participating in the Bill Walsh Minority Internship Program with the Tennessee Titans during the team's 2015 training camp, Alexander served as the defensive backs coach for Indiana State.

Montana State
Alexander again participated in the Bill Walsh Minority Internship Program in the summer of 2016, this time with the Tampa Bay Buccaneers. Following the two-week program, Alexander coached Montana State's secondary.

California
Alexander joined University of California's coaching staff in 2017 as their defensive backs coach. He served in that role through the 2019 season.

Miami Dolphins
On January 24, 2020, it was reported that Alexander was hired by the Miami Dolphins to serve as the team's defensive backs coach under head coach Brian Flores. He missed the team's week 9 game against the Arizona Cardinals on November 8, 2020, in accordance with COVID-19 protocols. On February 10, 2022, Alexander was fired by the Dolphins.

References

External links
Detroit Lions bio

1984 births
Living people
African-American coaches of American football
African-American players of American football
American football safeties
Arkansas State Red Wolves football coaches
Boise State Broncos football players
California Golden Bears football coaches
Carolina Panthers players
Detroit Lions players
Indiana State Sycamores football coaches
Jacksonville Jaguars players
Miami Dolphins coaches
Miami Dolphins players
Montana State Bobcats football coaches
New York Jets players
People from Rancho Cucamonga, California
Players of American football from California
Sportspeople from San Bernardino County, California
Tennessee Titans coaches
Washington Huskies football coaches
21st-century African-American sportspeople